Mucous gland, also known as muciparous glands, are found in several different parts of the body, and they typically stain lighter than serous glands during standard histological preparation. Most are multicellular, but goblet cells are single-celled glands.

Mucous salivary glands
The mucous salivary glands are similar in structure to the buccal and labial glands.

They are found especially at the back part behind the vallate papillae, but are also present at the apex and marginal parts.

In this connection the anterior lingual glands require special notice.

They are situated on the under surface of the apex of the tongue, one on either side of the frenulum, where they are covered by a fascicle of muscular fibers derived from the styloglossus and inferior longitudinal muscles. They produce a glycoprotein, mucin that absorbs water to form a sticky secretion called mucus.

They are from 12 to 25 mm. long, and about 8 mm. broad, and each opens by three or four ducts on the under surface of the apex.

The Weber's glands are an example of muciparous glands located along the tongue.

See also
 Mucus
 Gland
 Exocrine gland
 Weber's glands

References

External links
  - "Lingual glands"
 Overview at siumed.edu

Glands